This article lists the Polish titled families.

This list is not complete because in the 19th century Poland was a divided kingdom, between the Russian, the Austrian and the German Empires.

Princes 

See: Princely Houses of Poland

Marquesses 

See: Polish noble families with the title of Marquess

Counts 
See: Polish noble families with the title of Count

Barons 
See: Polish noble families with the title of Baron

Medieval magnates (możnowładcy)
 Clan of Bogoria
 Clan of Dunin
 Clan of Gryf
 Clan of Jelita
 Clan of Leliwa
 Clan of Jastrzębiec
 Clan of Odrowąż
 Clan of Ostoja
 Clan of Kur

See also
List of szlachta
Magnates of Poland and Lithuania

References 
 Konarski S., 1958, Armorial de la noblesse polonaise titrée, Paris.
 Kowalski M., 2007, Księstwa w przestrzeni politycznej I Rzeczpospolitej, [w:] I. Kiniorska, S. Sala (red.), Rola geografii społeczno-ekonomicznej w badaniach regionalnych, Instytut Geografii AŚ, PTG, Kielce, 2007, s. 177–186.
 Leitgeber S., 1993, Nowy Almanach Błękitny, Oficyna Wydawnicza „Audiutor", Poznań-Warszawa.
 Olszewski H., 1969, Ustrój polityczny Rzeczpospolitej (w:) Tazbir J. (red.), Polska XVII wieku – państwo, społeczeństwo, kultura. Wiedza Powszechna, Warszawa, s. 52–83.
 Peter Frank zu Döfering, Adelslexikon des Österreichischen Kaisertums 1804–1918. Verzeichnis der Gnadenakte, Standeserhebungen, Adelsanerkennungen und -bestätigungen im Österreichischen Staatsarchiv in Wien, Wien 1989.
 Der Adel von Galizien, Lodomerien und der Bukowina. J. Siebmacher's großes Wappenbuch, Band 32, Nürnberg 1905, s. 67–99.
 Tomasz Lenczewski, Genealogie rodów utytułowanych w Polsce, t. I, Warszawa 1997.
 Spiski licam titułowannym rossijskoj imperii, St. Petersburg 1892.
 Tadeusz Gajl Herby szlacheckie Rzeczypospolitej Obojga Narodów, Wydawnictwo L&L, Gdańsk 2003

External links
Confederation of the Polish Nobility
Polish Nobility Association Foundation
 https://web.archive.org/web/20110927205254/http://www.ornatowski.com/index/herbyszlacheckie_ll.htm
http://www.sejm-wielki.pl/

 
 

pl:Polskie rody książęce